Want Want Holdings Limited (Want Want) is a food manufacturer from Taiwan. It is one of the largest rice cake and flavored drink makers in Taiwan. It engages in the manufacturing and trading of snack foods and beverages, divided into four businesses: rice crackers, dairy products and beverages, snack foods (candies, jellies, popsicles, nuts, and ball cakes), and other products (mainly wine). It operates over 100 manufacturing plants in mainland China and 2 in Taiwan, and employs over 60,000 people.

History

In 1962, Want Want began operations in the name of I Lan Foods Industrial Company Limited in Yilan County, Taiwan, which manufactured canned agricultural products. It was founded by Tsai Eng-meng's father, Jonathan Shuai Qiang Ng.

Tsai Eng-meng took over his father's food business at the age of 19 and came up with a new product—crackers made from rice flour.

1983, it collaborated with Iwatsuka Confectionery Company Limited, one of the top three Japanese rice cracker makers, to develop a rice cracker market in Taiwan. In return, Iwatsuka obtained 5% of the common stock of the company.

1987, it became the first Taiwanese operator to apply for the registration of the "Want Want" trademark in China. In 1992, it started its business in Mainland China. In 1994, it commenced its first production plant in Changsha, Hunan. 1996, it was listed on the Singapore Stock Exchange under the name Want Want Holdings Pte Ltd.

2007, Want Want Holdings Pte Ltd was delisted from the Singapore Stock Exchange. In 2008, its subsidiary, Want Want China Holdings Limited, was listed on the Hong Kong Stock Exchange.

2008, Want Want China Holdings Ltd. was listed on the Main Board of the Hong Kong Stock Exchange Limited. HKEX STOCK CODE 0151. 2011, Want-Want China Holdings Ltd. was ranked one of the top choice of stocks to buy on the Hang Seng index.

2009, Want Want purchased China Times, as well as China Television (CTV) and CtiTV in 2009.

2014, Want Want China Holdings Ltd. won the Largest Food and Beverage Enterprise Award in the Global Top 1000 Chinese Entrepreneurs by Asia Business Week. President Tsai Eng-Meng was ranked Top 100 CEO appraised by Harvard Business Review Magazine.

2015, Want Want China Holdings Chief Operating Officer, Matthew Tsai, was honored with the "Chinese F&B Association of Science and Technology Innovation Award: Notable Youth Award." Want Want proudly obtains the title of "Consumer's Favorite Brand of 2015" for both the food industry and beverage industry.

2017, Want Want China Holdings Ltd. was selected as one of the top 20 international brands in Taiwan.

2020, Want Want China continued to receive third place for 12 consecutive years in Taiwan's Top 25 International Company Brands.

Logo 
The logo of Want Want is a boy that is wearing blue overalls. He sometimes has red cheeks, and is on all of the Want Want products, usually in a small print. The boy's tongue is shaped like a heart. Most of the time, his eyes are looking up.

Controversy 
Want Want has faced repeated accusations of close links to the Chinese Communist Party and has received subsidies from the Chinese government. The Financial Times reported that these ties include coordination with the Chinese government's Taiwan Affairs Office.

In November 2019, Wang Liqiang, a self-proclaimed Chinese spy who defected to Australia, claimed that the Want Want China Times Group's media brands China Television and Chung T'ien Television had received Chinese funding in return for airing stories unfavorable of the Taiwanese government and sought to influence the upcoming 2020 election. The Want Want China Times Group denied these allegations.

See also
 List of companies of Taiwan
 Want Want China
 I-Mei Foods

References

External links 
 

Manufacturing companies based in Taipei
Food and drink companies established in 1962
Food and drink companies of Taiwan
Multinational companies
Taiwanese brands
1962 establishments in Taiwan
Rice crackers